The Jazz Standards: A Guide to the Repertoire is a 2012 book by Ted Gioia documenting what he considers to be the most important tunes in the jazz repertoire. The book is published by Oxford University Press. The book features a range of jazz standards in alphabetical order, from Broadway show tunes by the likes of George Gershwin and Irving Berlin, to the standards of esteemed jazz musicians such as Duke Ellington, John Coltrane, Miles Davis, Thelonious Monk, Wayne Shorter and Charles Mingus. In the book Gioia has recommendations for definitive covers of each standard to listen to, over 2000 in total.

Background
Gioia states that he was inspired to write the book due to the difficulties he encountered as an aspiring jazz musician in his youth when he would turn up to jam sessions and feel embarrassed at not knowing the tunes and not having a list or some kind of reference he could use to learn to expected repertoire. He stated that: "I soon realized what countless other jazz musicians have no doubt also learned: in-depth study of the jazz repertoire is hardly a quaint historical sideline, but essential for survival. Not learning these songs puts a jazz player on a quick path to unemployment." Gioia's purpose for writing it was to provide a "type of survey, the kind of overview of the standard repertoire that I wished someone had given me back in the day—a guide that would have helped me as a musician, as a critic, as a historian, and simply as a fan and lover of the jazz idiom".

Reviews
The Telegraph states that it is a "comprehensive guide to the most important jazz compositions, is a unique resource, a browser's companion, and an invaluable introduction to the art form", adding that "musicians who play these songs night after night now have a handy guide, outlining their history and significance and telling how they have been performed by different generations of jazz artists", and is described as such on the Toronto Public Library website. Clive Davis writing for The Independent noted that "Apart from his elegant prose style, the first thing you notice about Ted Gioia's approach to his subject is that the music clearly gives him no end of pleasure", and that the book contains numerous "witty" personal anecdotes of Gioia's experience of the tunes. He considers The Jazz Standards: A Guide to the Repertoire a "bold attempt to summarise the core repertoire". The London Review of Bookshops  wrote that the book would "appeal to a wide audience, serving as a fascinating introduction for new fans, an invaluable and long-needed handbook for jazz lovers and musicians, and an indispensable reference for students and educators". Dennis Drabelle of The Washington Post remarked that it was "hard to quarrel with Gioia’s seemingly encyclopedic knowledge of what is still hot or not" but was critical of some of his omissions of information, such as failing to mention that "I Can't Give You Anything but Love, Baby" was prominent in the Howard Hawks comedy Bringing Up Baby (1938).

Standards
The following standards are listed in the book:

After You've Gone
Ain't Misbehavin'
Airegin
Alfie
All Blues
All of Me
All of You
All the Things You Are
Alone Together
Angel Eyes
April in Paris
Autumn in New York
Autumn Leaves
Bags' Groove
Basin Street Blues
Beale Street Blues
Bemsha Swing
Billie's Bounce
Blue Bossa
Blue in Green
Blue Monk
Blue Moon
Blue Skies
Bluesette
Body and Soul
But Beautiful
But Not For Me
Bye Bye Blackbird
C Jam Blues
Cantaloupe Island
Caravan
Chelsea Bridge
Cherokee
A Child Is Born
Come Rain or Come Shine
Come Sunday
Con Alma
Confirmation
Corcovado
Cotton Tail
Darn That Dream
Days of Wine and Roses
Desafinado
Dinah
Django
Do Nothing till You Hear from Me
Do You Know What It Means to Miss New Orleans?
Donna Lee
Don't Blame Me
Don't Get Around Much Anymore
East of the Sun (and West of the Moon)
Easy Living
Easy to Love
Embraceable You
Emily
Epistrophy
Everything Happens to Me
Evidence
Ev'ry Time We Say Goodbye
Exactly Like You
Falling In Love With Love
Fascinating Rhythm
Fly Me to the Moon
A Foggy Day
Footprints
Gee, Baby, Ain't I Good to You
Georgia On My Mind
Ghost of a Chance
Giant Steps
The Girl From Ipanema
God Bless the Child
Gone With the Wind
Good Morning Heartache
Goodbye Pork Pie Hat
Groovin' High
Have You Met Miss Jones?
Here's That Rainy Day
Honeysuckle Rose
Hot House
How Deep Is The Ocean?
How High The Moon
How Insensitive
How Long Has This Been Going On?
I Can't Get Started
I Can't Give You Anything But Love
I Cover the Waterfront
I Didn't Know What Time It Was
I Fall In Love Too Easily
I Got It Bad (and That Ain't Good)
I Got Rhythm
I Hear a Rhapsody
I Let a Song Go Out of My Heart
I Love You
I Mean You
I Only Have Eyes For You
I Remember Clifford
I Should Care
I Surrender, Dear
I Thought About You
I Want to Be Happy
If You Could See Me Now
I'll Remember April
I'm in the Mood for Love
Impressions
In a Mellow Tone
In a Sentimental Mood
In Your Own Sweet Way
Indiana
Invitation
It Could Happen to You
It Don't Mean a Thing (If It Ain't Got That Swing)
It Might as Well Be Spring
I've Found a New Baby
Jitterbug Waltz
Joy Spring
Just Friends
Just One of Those Things
Just You, Just Me
King Porter Stomp
Lady Bird
The Lady Is a Tramp
Lament
Laura
Lester Leaps In
Like Someone in Love
Limehouse Blues
Liza
Lonely Woman
Love for Sale
Lover
Lover, Come Back to Me
Lover Man
Lullaby of Birdland
Lush Life
Mack the Knife
Maiden Voyage
The Man I Love
Manhã de Carnaval
Mean to Me
Meditation
Memories of You
Milestones
Misterioso
Misty
Moment's Notice
Mood Indigo
More Than You Know
Muskrat Ramble
My Favorite Things
My Foolish Heart
My Funny Valentine
My Old Flame
My One and Only Love
My Romance
Naima
Nardis
Nature Boy
The Nearness of You
Nice Work If You Can Get It
Night and Day
Night in Tunisia
Night Train
Now's the Time
Nuages
Oh, Lady Be Good!
Old Folks
Oleo
On a Clear Day
On Green Dolphin Street
On the Sunny Side of the Street
Once I Loved
One Note Samba
One o'Clock Jump
Ornithology
Our Love is Here to Stay
Out of Nowhere
Over the Rainbow
Peace
The Peacocks
Pennies From Heaven
Perdido
Poinciana
Polka Dots and Moonbeams
Prelude to a Kiss
Rhythm-a-ning
'Round Midnight
Royal Garden Blues
Ruby, My Dear
St. James Infirmary
St. Louis Blues
St. Thomas
Satin Doll
Scrapple from the Apple
Secret Love
The Shadow of Your Smile
Shine
Skylark
Smile
Smoke Gets In Your Eyes
So What
Softly, as in a Morning Sunrise
Solar
Solitude
Someday My Prince Will Come
Someone to Watch Over Me
Song For My Father
The Song Is You
Sophisticated Lady
Soul Eyes
Speak Low
Spring Can Really Hang You Up the Most
Spring Is Here
Stardust
Star Eyes
Stella By Starlight
Stolen Moments
Stompin' at the Savoy
Stormy Weather
Straight No Chaser
Struttin' with Some Barbecue
Summertime
Sweet Georgia Brown
'S Wonderful
Take Five
Take the A Train
Tea For Two
Tenderly
There Is No Greater Love
There Will Never Be Another You
These Foolish Things
They Can't Take That Away from Me
Things Ain't What They Used to Be
Tiger Rag
Time After Time
Tin Roof Blues
The Very Thought of You
Waltz For Debby
Watermelon Man
Wave
The Way You Look Tonight
Well, You Needn't
What Is This Thing Called Love?
What's New?
When the Saints Go Marching In
Whisper Not
Willow Weep For Me
Yardbird Suite
Yesterdays
You Don't Know What Love Is
You Go To My Head
You Stepped Out of a Dream
You'd Be So Nice to Come Home To

References

Jazz books
2012 non-fiction books
Oxford University Press books